Zelten is a traditional Italian fruitcake prepared during Christmas. It is prepared using rye flour, wheat flour, dried and candied fruits, orange zest, and various spices. The name derives from the word selten, a word in the nearby dialect meaning "seldom", since it is usually only prepared once a year.

Gallery

See also
 List of Italian desserts and pastries
 Italian cuisine
 Früchtebrot

References

Italian desserts
Fruit dishes
Christmas cakes